Yusuf Saad Kamel, born Gregory Konchellah (born 29 March 1983) is a male former middle-distance runner who competed in the 800 metres and 1500 metres. Born in Narok, Kenya – the son of former two-time 800 metres World Champion Billy Konchellah – he represented Bahrain internationally. Kamel won the gold in the 1500 m and bronze in 800 m at the 2009 World Championships in Athletics held in Berlin.

In early 2009 he stopped competing for Bahrain claiming unpaid salary and bonuses. He was willing to compete for Kenya, but his Kenyan passport was held by Bahraini officials. Without a passport, he was unable to compete in any competition. Several other Kenyan runners who took Bahraini citizenship have also left Bahrain and are vying to compete for Kenya. However, he returned to the track in July 2009 at the Athletissima meeting, still representing Bahrain. Subsequently, Athletics Kenya stopped to handle his attempt to compete for Kenya.

At the 2011 World Championships in Athletics in Daegu he only participated at the 1500 m but just failed to qualify for the final.

He trained with PACE Sports Management under Ricky Simms.

Statistics

Competition record

Circuit wins
800 metres
Memorial Van Damme: 2008
ISTAF Berlin: 2004

See also
List of middle-distance runners
List of eligibility transfers in athletics
List of World Athletics Championships medalists (men)
List of sportspeople who competed for more than one nation
List of Asian Games medalists in athletics
List of IAAF World Indoor Championships medalists (men)
800 metres at the World Championships in Athletics
1500 metres at the World Championships in Athletics

References

External links

 
 Pace Sports Management

1983 births
Living people
People from Narok County
Bahraini male middle-distance runners
Kenyan male middle-distance runners
Olympic athletes of Bahrain
Athletes (track and field) at the 2004 Summer Olympics
Athletes (track and field) at the 2008 Summer Olympics
Asian Games gold medalists for Bahrain
Asian Games medalists in athletics (track and field)
Athletes (track and field) at the 2006 Asian Games
Athletes (track and field) at the 2010 Asian Games
Athletes (track and field) at the 2014 Asian Games
Medalists at the 2006 Asian Games
World Athletics Championships athletes for Bahrain
World Athletics Championships medalists
Kenyan emigrants to Bahrain
Naturalized citizens of Bahrain
World Athletics Championships winners